The Pioneer Trail Wind Farm is a 94-turbine wind farm, established in 2011, in Ford County and Iroquois County in the U.S. state of Illinois.   The wind farm is headquartered in the Ford County seat of Paxton.

Detail
The Pioneer Trail complex's 94 wind turbines, each rated at 1.6 mW, can generate up to 150.4 megawatts of electricity.  The northeastern Illinois project was developed by E.ON Climate Renwables, a subsidiary of E.ON.  E.ON has resold some of the power generated by Pioneer Trail to the Southern Illinois Power Cooperative.

References

Buildings and structures in Ford County, Illinois
Buildings and structures in Iroquois County, Illinois
Energy infrastructure completed in 2011
Wind farms in Illinois